USNS Bruce C. Heezen (T-AGS 64) is a Pathfinder class oceanographic survey ship. It is the fifth ship in the class.

Naming
She is named after Bruce C. Heezen, who was the leader of the team from Columbia University that discovered the Mid-Atlantic Ridge during the 1950s. The ship was the first Navy vessel to be named by civilians.  Nine students from Oaklawn Elementary School in Cranston, RI named the ship after winning a contest sponsored by the Navy.  Amanda Baillargeon, James Coogan, Meagan Durigan, Stephen Fish, Patricia Gumbley, John Lucier, Sara Piccirilli, Dana Scott, and Rebecca Webber were led by their teacher Marilyn Remick.

References

External links

 USNS Heezen official web site

 

Pathfinder-class survey ships
Ships built in Pascagoula, Mississippi
1999 ships